Reunite International Child Abduction Centre  is recognized as the leading UK charity focusing on international child abduction.

History

Reunite began in 1986 as reunite National Council for Abducted Children, a parent support network formed by parents trying to navigate their way through the legal issues surrounding international parental child abduction. It was registered as a charity in 1990 and over the years evolved and developed into an information and resource centre.  It was in 1999 that it changed its name to reunite International Child Abduction Centre

References

External links
reunite's website

Non-profit organisations based in the United Kingdom
International child abduction
Child safety
Law enforcement in the United Kingdom